Christian Dubé (born April 25, 1977) is a Canadian/Swiss ice hockey executive and former professional right winger. He is currently the sports director of HC Fribourg-Gottéron in the Swiss National League A.

Biography
Dubé was born in Sherbrooke, Quebec. He is the son of former pro hockey player Norm Dubé.

As a youth, Dubé played in the 1990 and 1991 Quebec International Pee-Wee Hockey Tournaments with a minor ice hockey team from Sherbrooke. He spent many years growing up in Switzerland, while his father was playing there. He returned to Canada as a teenager, and played for the Sherbrooke Faucons of the Quebec Major Junior Hockey League. 

In 1995, he was drafted by the New York Rangers with the 39th pick. He made his debut with the Rangers in the 1996–97 season. He would play another 6 games with the Rangers in 1998–99. After that season he headed back to Switzerland, where he played, three season at HC Lugano, nine seasons for SC Bern and another four years at HC Fribourg-Gottéron. Because he started playing hockey as a child in Switzerland, he could join teams in Switzerland as a non-import player without having Swiss citizenship.

Dubé retired following the 2014-15 season and was named sports director of Swiss NLA side HC Fribourg-Gottéron in March 2015.

Career statistics

Regular season and playoffs

International

References

External links 
 
 Dubé on hockeyfans.ch

1977 births
Living people
Canadian emigrants to Switzerland
Canadian expatriate ice hockey players in Switzerland
Canadian ice hockey right wingers
French Quebecers
Hartford Wolf Pack players
HC Fribourg-Gottéron players
HC Lugano players
HC Martigny players
Hull Olympiques players
Ice hockey people from Quebec
New York Rangers draft picks
New York Rangers players
SC Bern players
Sherbrooke Faucons players
Sportspeople from Sherbrooke